Henry Stronach (27 January 1865 – 12 April 1932) was a New Zealand cricketer. He played six first-class matches for Otago between 1892 and 1895.

See also
 List of Otago representative cricketers

References

External links
 

1865 births
1932 deaths
New Zealand cricketers
Otago cricketers
Sportspeople from Canterbury